"Second Chance" is a short story by Orson Scott Card.  It appears in his short story collections Capitol and The Worthing Saga.  Card first published it in the anthology Destinies (January–February 1979).

Plot summary
When Batta Heddis is a child, her father loses his legs in an accident.  Because her mother is not responsible enough to take care of the family, Batta ends up taking care of everyone. 

While attending college, she meets a man named Abner Doon.  They become very close and spend a lot of time together.  After Batta graduates from college, they go their separate ways.  A year later, Abner comes to her house and asks her to go out with him.  She refuses because her family needs her.  When Batta’s brother and sister grow up and move out, Abner returns and asks her to marry him.  While they discuss it and the possibility of them both going under the fictional drug Somec so they can undergo suspended animation for a few years, he has her memories taped.  However, just as Abner is about to give her the Somec, she changes her mind and goes back to take care of her parents. 

By the time her parents die, Batta is almost insane from the hardship of taking care of them.  When Abner shows up and offers to wipe her memories with Somec and play the recording he had made of her mind years earlier, she jumps at the chance.  However, when she wakes up, Batta cannot escape the feeling that she has abandoned her parents and asks to have her old memories back.

Connection to the Worthing Saga
This story uses several plot elements also used in The Worthing Saga, such as the sleeping drug Somec and the taping of memories.  It takes place on the planet Capitol years after the events in the story "Skipping Stones".  The story of Abner Doon’s failed relationship with Batta Heddis also appears in a much shorter form as a part of chapter 5 in Card's novel The Worthing Chronicle.

See also

 List of works by Orson Scott Card
 Orson Scott Card

External links
 The official Orson Scott Card website

Short stories by Orson Scott Card